Marcel Gecov (born 1 January 1988) is a Czech former footballer who played as a midfielder.

Club career 
Gecov began his club career with Slavia Prague at the age of six. The young midfielder went through all the youth teams of Slavia. He was 17 years old when he was promoted to the A-team. Gecov did not get a chance to make his debut in the Gambrinus liga for Slavia. In January 2007, Gecov was sent to SK Kladno on loan for the rest of the season.

Gecov made his debut in the Czech top flight in March 2007 against Tescoma Zlín. He started seventeen times for Kladno and scored one goal. In January 2008 Gecov signed a long-term contract lasting  years with FC Slovan Liberec.

On 20 July 2011, Fulham announced the signing of Gecov on a two-year deal for an undisclosed fee. Gecov made his Fulham debut on Wednesday, 21 September in the League Cup against Chelsea at Stamford Bridge and he made his Premier League debut against Liverpool on 5 December 2011 at Craven Cottage.

On 23 July 2012, Gent signed Gecov from Fulham for an undisclosed fee, but only a few months later he was deemed surplus and Gent accepted an undisclosed fee from his ex-club Slavia Prague.

On 6 July 2015, Gecov joined Polish club Śląsk Wrocław.

National team 
Gecov has represented his country at all age levels. He was also a part of the Czech squad at the 2007 FIFA U-20 World Cup in Canada where he played six matches and helped the team to its second place. He represented Czech Republic under–21s at the 2011 UEFA European Under-21 Football Championship and was named in the team of the tournament. Gecov made his debut for the senior side on 10 August 2011 as a starter in the 0–3 loss against Norway in a friendly match.

Honours
Czech Rupublic U-21
FIFA U-20 World Cup runner-up (1) 2007

References

External links

 
 Profile on fotbal.idnes.cz 
 

1988 births
Living people
Footballers from Prague
Czech footballers
Association football forwards
SK Slavia Prague players
SK Kladno players
FC Slovan Liberec players
Fulham F.C. players
K.A.A. Gent players
FC Rapid București players
Czech First League players
Belgian Pro League players
Premier League players
Liga I players
Czech Republic youth international footballers
Czech Republic under-21 international footballers
Czech Republic international footballers
Czech expatriate footballers
Expatriate footballers in England
Expatriate footballers in Romania
Expatriate footballers in Poland
Śląsk Wrocław players
Ekstraklasa players